Johan Landsberg (born 30 December 1974) is a former professional tennis player from Sweden.

Career
Landsberg, a doubles specialist, competed in 21 Grand Slam men's doubles tournaments over the course of his career. He also played mixed doubles in five of those events, the 2000 French Open and every Wimbledon Championship from 2000 to 2003. His best result in the mixed was making the quarter-finals of the 2002 Wimbledon Championships, partnering countrywoman Åsa Svensson. In the men's doubles he twice reached the third round, the first time being his Grand Slam debut, at the 2000 Australian Open. Landsberg and his partner Simon Aspelin defeated the number six seeds in that tournament, South Africans David Adams and John-Laffnie de Jager. His second appearance in the third round appearance came in the 2002 US Open, with Tom Vanhoudt. His other men's doubles partners at Grand Slam level were Stephen Huss, Thomas Johansson, Aleksandar Kitinov, Jarkko Nieminen Peter Nyborg, Robin Söderling and Jeff Tarango.

The Swede won two ATP doubles titles during his career, at the 2000 Open 13 and in Bucharest the following year. He made his final ATP World Tour appearance in the 2007 Swedish Open and now coaches Finnish tennis player Harri Heliövaara.

ATP career finals

Doubles: 3 (2–1)

Challenger titles

Doubles: (6)

References

External links
 
 
 Tennis Inc Tennis Academy in Beirut (Managed by Ali Hamadeh & Johan Landsberg)

1974 births
Living people
Swedish male tennis players
Tennis players from Stockholm